The 2018–19 CSA T20 Challenge was the sixteenth season of the CSA T20 Challenge, established by Cricket South Africa. It took place from 5 April to 5 May 2019. Titans were the defending champions.

In April 2019, Cricket South Africa announced that this would be the final edition of the T20 Challenge, due to austerity measures and a restructure of domestic cricket in the country. Rain played a factor during the tournament, with several matches ending in a no result or being abandoned, including all three matches scheduled to be played on Easter Monday.

Following the conclusion of the group stage matches, Lions, Warriors, Cape Cobras and Dolphins had all progressed to the semi-finals of the tournament. Lions and Dolphins played each other in the first semi-final, with Warriors and Cape Cobras playing each other in the second semi-final. In the first semi-final, Lions beat Dolphins by eight wickets to progress to the final of the tournament. They were joined in the final by Warriors, who beat Cape Cobras by 15 runs in their semi-final match. Lions won the tournament, beating Warriors by 11 runs in the final.

Points table

Fixtures

Round-robin

Finals

References

South African domestic cricket competitions
CSA T20 Challenge
2018–19 South African cricket season